Lucky Devils is the title of three films:

 Lucky Devils (1932 film), a Swedish comedy film starring Sigurd Wallén and Tutta Rolf
 Lucky Devils (1933 film), an American film starring William Boyd and Bruce Cabot
 Lucky Devils (1941 film), an American film featuring Andy Devine and Richard Arlen

See also
 The Lucky Devil, a 1925 film starring Richard Dix